Tomeka Reid (born 1977) is an American composer, improviser, cellist, curator, and teacher.

Reid has performed and recorded with the Art Ensemble of Chicago, Nicole Mitchell, Anthony Braxton, the AACM Great Black Music Ensemble, Mike Reed's Loose Assembly, and Roscoe Mitchell.

Reid founded and, as of 2022, still runs the now-annual Chicago Jazz String Summit and was named a 2017 "Chicago Jazz Hero" by the Jazz Journalists Association. In 2019, Reid was appointed Darius Milhaud Distinguished Visiting Professor at Mills College. She is a 2021 United States Artists Fellow and 2022 MacArthur Fellow.

Early life and classical education

Reid grew up outside of Washington, D.C., and in the 4th grade began playing cello at her elementary school in Silver Spring, Maryland. Reid attended a French immersion school, but spoke very little French; she attributes much of her early enthusiasm for cello to the allowance of English in music class. Reid could not afford additional cello instruction until high school: she briefly attended the Duke Ellington School of the Arts before dropping out due to the high cost of out-of-state enrollment, but assistance for low-income students enabled her to study at Levine School of Music in D.C.

After high school, Reid began studying classical music at the University of Maryland, where she reconnected with Saïs Kamalidiin, a professor she had met at the Duke Ellington School. Reid primarily studied classical music, but Kamalidiin introduced her to jazz performance and improvisation. Reid also met Nicole Mitchell as an undergraduate, during a summer spent in Chicago; Mitchell became another close mentor in improvised music, and Reid went on to perform on over ten albums with her, many as part of Mitchell's Black Earth Ensemble and Black Earth Strings quartet. Reid continued to focus on classical music for the next several years after meeting Mitchell: she earned her Bachelor of Music in 2000, and then moved to Chicago, where she continued her studies in classical cello performance at DePaul University. She completed her Master of Music in 2002. After graduating, Reid began teaching at the University of Chicago Laboratory Schools, where she co-directed the string program for seven years.

Career in jazz 

Reid became increasingly involved in the jazz community after moving to Chicago, and in 2009 she decided to more fully commit to the genre by beginning coursework toward a Doctor of Musical Arts in Jazz Studies.

Later that year Reid played a show at The Hideout in a special version of Mike Reed's Loose Assembly, with the quintet of Reed, Reid, Jason Adasiewicz, and Joshua Abrams joined by Roscoe Mitchell. A recording of the performance was later released as the album Empathetic Parts. In 2010 Reid was also appointed Treasurer of the Association for the Advancement of Creative Musicians and played the Umbria Jazz Festival as part of the AACM Great Black Music Ensemble.

In 2011, Reid left her job as orchestra director at the Lab School, choosing to instead focus on her career as a musician. New Braxton House released Trillium E, the first studio recording of an Anthony Braxton opera, featuring the Tri-Centric Orchestra, which Reid had joined for the recording. The following year she was awarded a residency at the University of Chicago's Washington Park Arts Incubator and released her first album with Hear In Now, a co-led trio with Mazz Swift and Silvia Bolognesi.

In 2013, Reid founded the Chicago Jazz String Summit (CJSS), an international festival of avant-garde string performances. After a three-year gap, starting in 2016 Reid has continued to organize the CJSS as an annual Chicago event during the first weekend of May, even though she moved to New York City for four years. Reid ran the 2020 and 2021 Chicago Jazz String Summits as online streamed events, via Chicago's Experimental Sound Studio's facilities, due to the COVID-19 pandemic.

The Chicago Tribune named Reid Chicagoan of the Year in Jazz at the end of a highly decorated 2015: Reid completed and released her first album of original works, the eponymous Tomeka Reid Quartet, and a co-led trio with Nicole Mitchell and Mike Reed released their self-titled debut, Artifacts. The Chicago Reader included the quartet release, with Tomas Fujiwara, Jason Roebke, and Mary Halvorson, as among the best albums of 2015 and the best Chicago albums of the decade. DownBeat said Artifacts "might be one of the most important AACM records in a generation". Both albums were included in the year's NPR Music Jazz Critics Poll. Reid performed with a quartet arranged by Roscoe Mitchell, a recording of which was released later that year as Celebrating Fred Anderson, and performed at the Chicago Jazz Festival, Hyde Park Jazz Festival, Pritzker Pavilion, Symphony Center, and Chicago Cultural Center.

In 2016, Reid performed with Anthony Braxton's "10+1tet" at Big Ears Festival in Knoxville, Tennessee and was the recipient of a 3Arts Award.

Reid received her DMA in Jazz Studies from the University of Illinois at Urbana–Champaign in 2017. Her year in releases included the Hear in Now trio's second record, Not Living In Fear, and Signaling, a duo album with  that was also included among the Chicago Reader'''s best Chicago albums of the decade. She was named 2017 "Chicago Jazz Hero" by the Jazz Journalists Association.

In 2018, Reid performed with the Chicago Composers Orchestra in premiering her first orchestral composition, and traveled to Ethiopia, where she studied the masenqo, an East African string instrument. She appeared on 2018 releases including a collective trio album with Dave Rempis and Joshua Abrams, titled Ithra; Geometry Of Caves, by a quartet with Kyoko Kitamura, Taylor Ho Bynum, and Joe Morris; and on Makaya McCraven's Universal Beings.

In 2019, Reid was a Foundation for Contemporary Arts Grants to Artists recipient; the award assisted her in commuting between tour and work when she was notified in late August that she had received a fall appointment as Darius Milhaud Chair (visiting professor) in Music Composition at Mills College.

She was winner of the "Miscellaneous Instrument" category in the 2019 and 2020 DownBeat critics polls and is a 2021 United States Artists Fellow. In June 2020, the New York Times consulted Tomeka Reid, along with artists including Yo-Yo Ma, to offer suggestions for cello recordings that could make newcomers to the instrument "fall in love" with its sounds; Reid recommended a composition by Abdul Wadud.

In October 2022, Reid was awarded a prestigious MacArthur Fellowship.  During 2022 she has been "Improviser in residence" for the city of Moers, Germany, in affiliation with the Moers [music] Festival.

 Personal life 

In 2020, Reid moved back to Chicago, after having left for New York City circa 2016.  As of 2022, Reid lives in Chicago with her husband David Brown, professor of architecture at the University of Illinois at Chicago.

Discography

As leader
 Hairy Who & the Chicago Imagists (Corbett vs. Dempsey, 2014)
 Tomeka Reid Quartet (Thirsty Ear, 2015)
 Old New (Cuneiform Records, 2019)

As co-leader
Artifacts (with Nicole Mitchell and Mike Reed)
 Artifacts (482 Music, 2015)
 ...and then there's this (Astral Spirits Records, 2021)<ref>{{cite news| publisher=Chicago Reader| title=Artifacts, and then there's this| date=October 28, 2021| author=Meyer, Bill|author-link=Bill Meyer (journalist)}}</ref>
 Alexander Hawkins & Reid
 Shards and Constellations (Intakt Records, 2020)
Hear In Now (with Mazz Swift and Silvia Bolognesi)
 Hear in Now (Rudi Records, 2012)
 Not Living In Fear (International Anthem Recording Company, 2017)
Joe McPhee / Dave Rempis / Reid / Brandon Lopez / Paal Nilssen-Love
 Of Things Beyond Thule Vol. 1 (Aerophonic, 2020)
Reid / Kyoko Kitamura / Taylor Ho Bynum / Joe Morris
 Geometry of Caves (Relative Pitch Records, 2018)
 Geometry of Distance (Relative Pitch, 2019)
Reid & Nick Mazzarella
 Signaling (Nessa Records, 2017)
Reid / 
 The Mouser (Relative Pitch, 2019)
Reid & Joe Morris
Combinations 2020 (RogueArt, 2020)
Dave Rempis / Reid / Joshua Abrams
 Ithra (Aerophonic, 2018) 
Claudia Solal, Katherine Young, Reid, Benoît Delbecq
 Antichamber Music (The Bridge Sessions, 2019)
 Live In Toledo (Veto Records, 2013)
 Live At the Hungry Brain (Veto Records, 2017)
 Watershed (RogueArt, 2012)

As sideperson
with Anthony Braxton
 Trillium E (New Braxton House, 2011)
 10+1tet (Knoxville) (Braxton Bootleg, 2016)
 Anthony Braxton's Language Music (Sound American, 2016)
 with Jaimie Branch
 Fly or Die (International Anthem, 2017)
 Fly or Die II: Bird Dogs of Paradise (International Anthem, 2019)
with Taylor Ho Bynum
 Enter the Plustet (Firehouse 12, 2016)
 The Ambiguity Manifesto (Firehouse 12, 2019)
with Nicole Mitchell
 Afrika Rising (Dreamtime, 2002)
 Hope, Future and Destiny (Dreamtime, 2004)
 Black Unstoppable (Delmark, 2007)
 Renegades (Delmark, 2008)
 Xenogenesis Suite (Firehouse 12, 2008)
 Intergalactic Beings (FPE, 2014)
 Liberation Narratives (Black Earth Music, 2017)
 Mandorla Awakening II (FPE, 2017)
 Maroon Cloud (FPE, 2018)
 Mitchell and Lisa E. Harris, EarthSeed (FPE,2020)
with Mike Reed's Loose Assembly
 Last Year's Ghost (482 Music, 2007)
 The Speed of Change (482 Music, 2008)
 Empathetic Parts (482 Music, 2010)
With others
 The AACM Great Black Music Ensemble, At Umbria Jazz 2009 (Musica Jazz, 2010)
 Joshua Abrams, Represencing (Eremite, 2012)
 Living By Lanterns (Jason Adasiewicz & Mike Reed), New Myth/Old Science (Cuneiform, 2012)
 All City Affairs (Peter Andreadis), Bees (Lujo, 2006)
 , From Beyond (Sundmagi, 2006)
 Dee Alexander, Sketches of Light (EGEA, 2012)
 Art Ensemble of Chicago, We Are On the Edge (Pi, 2019)
 Art Ensemble of Chicago, The Sixth Decade: From Paris to Paris (RogueArt, 2023)
 Baby Teeth, The Simp (Lujo, 2007)
 Birthmark, Antibodies (Polyvinyl, 2012)
 Silvia Bolognesi, Chicago Sessions (Fonterossa Records, 2015)
 Bronze, Calypso Shakedown (Unsound Records, 2009)
 Jeremy Cunningham, The Weather Up There (Northern Spy, 2020)
 Dave Douglas, Engage (Greenleaf, 2019)
 , Wintres Woma (Paradise Of Bachelors, 2017)
 Kahil El'Zabar, Kahil El’Zabar's America the Beautiful (Spiritmuse Records, 2020)
 , 7 Poets Trio (RogueArt, 2019)
 Theaster Gates, One (IHME, 2017)
 Giddy Motors, Make It Pop (FatCat, 2002)
 Hecuba, Paradise (Manimal Vinyl, 2009)
 HiM, Peoples (After Hours, 2005)
 Devin Hoff, The Lost Songs Of Lemuria (self-released, 2013)
 Luz, Polemonta (Auand, 2014)
 Man Man, Rabbit Habits (Anti-, 2008)
 The Margots (Adrienne Pierluissi, Ken Vandermark, et al.) Pescado (Okka Disk, 2013)
 Makaya McCraven, Universal Beings (International Anthem, 2018)
 Makaya McCraven, Universal Beings E&F Sides (International Anthem, 2020)
 Dave McDonnell Group, The Time Inside a Year (Delmark, 2015)
 Roscoe Mitchell & Nicole Mitchell, Three Compositions (RogueArt, 2012)
 Roscoe Mitchell, Celebrating Fred Anderson (Nessa, 2015)
 The National Trust, Kings & Queens (Thrill Jockey, 2006)
  & Body MemOri, Felt/not said (Auspice Now, 2021)
 OHMME, Parts (Joyful Noise, 2018)
 Owen, Ghost Town (Polyvinyl, 2011)
 Owen, L'Ami du Peuple (Polyvinyl, 2013)
 , Ism (International Anthem, 2019)
 Dave Rempis, Nettles (Aerophonic, 2016)
 , Bitter Almonds (Much Prefer Records, 2017)
 Savath & Savalas (Guillermo Scott Herren), Golden Pollen (Anti-, 2007)
 Third Coast Ensemble (Rob Mazurek, Christophe Rocher, et al.), Wrecks (RogueArt, 2017)
 TromBari (Glenn Wilson & Jim Pugh), The Devil's Hopyard (Jazzmaniac, 2012)

References

External links

 

Living people
1977 births
Jazz cellists
American jazz cellists
American jazz musicians
American women jazz musicians
DePaul University alumni
University of Maryland, College Park alumni
Musicians from Washington, D.C.
21st-century American women musicians
African-American composers
African-American women composers
American women composers
RogueArt artists
African-American women musicians
21st-century African-American women
21st-century African-American musicians
20th-century African-American people
20th-century African-American women
21st-century cellists